Illinois Route 73 is a north–south state highway in northwest Illinois. It runs from the U.S. Route 52/Illinois Route 64 concurrency south of Lanark north to the Wisconsin border north of Winslow.

Route description 
Illinois 73 is a two-lane surface road for its entire length. At its northern terminus, Illinois 73 becomes County Highway M in Green County, Wisconsin. This is the only state highway that does not either continue as another state highway, or end at a ferry crossing (current or former).

History 
SBI Route 73 existed from Illinois Route 72 north of Lanark to Winslow. Around 1982, it replaced Illinois 72 from north of Lanark south to U.S. Route 52.

Major intersections

References

External links

 Illinois Highway Ends: Illinois Route 73

073
Transportation in Stephenson County, Illinois
Transportation in Carroll County, Illinois